Miloš Žeravica (Serbian Cyrillic: Милош Жеравица; born 22 Јuly 1988) is a Serbian professional footballer who plays as a midfielder for Macedonian First League club FK Sileks.

He was also a member of the Serbia national U21 football team from 2007 to 2009, making 1 appearance in the process but did not score a goal.

Honours

Club
Napredak Kruševac
Serbian First League: 2012–13

Zrinjski Mostar
Bosnian Premier League: 2015–16

Borac Banja Luka
First League of RS: 2018–19

References

External links
Miloš Žeravica at Sofascore

1988 births
Living people
Sportspeople from Zrenjanin
Serbian footballers
Association football midfielders
OFK Beograd players
FK Proleter Zrenjanin players
FK Palilulac Beograd players
FK Napredak Kruševac players
FK Sloboda Užice players
HŠK Zrinjski Mostar players
Serbian SuperLiga players
Grindavík men's football players